Coritiba Foot Ball Club, commonly known as Coritiba de Sergipe or simply Coritiba, is a Brazilian football and futsal club based in Itabaiana, Sergipe, Brazil.

History
The club was founded as a futsal club on 14 September 1972, by the politician and former sportsman Wilson Gia da Cunha, who named the club after Paraná club Coritiba Foot Ball Club, adopting similar name, colors and team kits.

Football
They won the Campeonato Sergipano Série A2 in 1998 and 2013

Futsal
Coritiba won the Campeonato Sergipano de Futsal in 1993, 1994, 1995, 1996, 1997, 1998,  and in 1999, the Liga Norte-Nordeste de Futsal in 1998, and the Copa do Nordeste de Futsal in 1999.

Honours

Football
 Campeonato Sergipano Série A2:
 Winners (2): 1998,2013

Futsal
 Liga Norte-Nordeste de Futsal:
 Winners (1): 1998
 Copa do Nordeste de Futsal:
 Winners (1): 1999
 Campeonato Sergipano de Futsal:
 Winners (7): 1993, 1994, 1995, 1996, 1997, 1998, 1999

Stadium
Coritiba play their home games at the Estádio Presidente Emílio Garratazu Médici, commonly known as Estádio Presidente Médici. The stadium has a maximum capacity of 11,000 people.

References

Association football clubs established in 1972
Futsal clubs established in 1972
Football clubs in Sergipe
Futsal clubs in Brazil
1972 establishments in Brazil